John Frederick Gosling (19 February 1833 – 16 October 1882) was an English cricketer who made a single first-class cricket appearance for Kent County Cricket Club in 1858. He was born at North Cray in Kent, and educated at Rugby School.

Gosling made his only appearance for Kent against an England side in 1858 at the St Lawrence Ground in Canterbury. He died at Bream, Gloucestershire in October 1882 aged 49.

References

External links

1833 births
1882 deaths
People from North Cray
People educated at Rugby School
English cricketers
Kent cricketers